Fort Hall is a census-designated place (CDP) in the southeastern part of the U.S. state of Idaho which is split between Bannock County in the south and Bingham County in the north. It is located on the Fort Hall Indian Reservation along the Snake River north of Pocatello and near the site of the original Fort Hall in the Oregon Country. The population was 3,201 at the 2010 census.

The Bannock County portion of Fort Hall is part of the 'Pocatello, Idaho Metropolitan Statistical Area', while the Bingham County portion is part of the 'Blackfoot, Idaho Micropolitan Statistical Area'.

Geography
Fort Hall is located at  (43.018506, -112.448301).

Climate
According to the Köppen Climate Classification system, Fort Hall has a semi-arid climate, abbreviated "BSk" on climate maps.

Demographics

As of the census of 2000, there were 3,193 people, 969 households, and 781 families residing in the CDP. The racial makeup of the CDP was 30.22% White, 0.03% African American, 65.39% Native American, 0.31% Asian, 0.03% Pacific Islander, 2.25% from other races, and 1.75% from two or more races. Hispanic or Latino of any race were 7.61% of the population.

There were 969 households, out of which 42.2% had children under the age of 18 living with them, 49.6% were married couples living together, 22.5% had a female householder with no husband present, and 19.3% were non-families. 16.3% of all households were made up of individuals, and 4.4% had someone living alone who was 65 years of age or older.  The average household size was 3.26 and the average family size was 3.63.

In the CDP, the population was spread out, with 34.7% under the age of 18, 11.3% from 18 to 24, 28.2% from 25 to 44, 18.5% from 45 to 64, and 7.3% who were 65 years of age or older.  The median age was 28 years. For every 100 females, there were 94.7 males.  For every 100 females age 18 and over, there were 92.3 males.

The median income for a household in the CDP was $30,313, and the median income for a family was $32,256. Males had a median income of $27,310 versus $21,544 for females. The per capita income for the CDP was $10,563.  About 22.6% of families and 27.2% of the population were below the poverty line, including 32.5% of those under age 18 and 26.9% of those age 65 or over.

References

External links

Census-designated places in Idaho
Census-designated places in Bingham County, Idaho

Census-designated places in Bannock County, Idaho
Pocatello, Idaho metropolitan area